Mologino is a village in Rzhevsky District of Tver Oblast, Russia. It was made the central locus of the Ramensky family hoax.

References

Rural localities in Rzhevsky District
Staritsky Uyezd